The 1990–91 St. Francis Terriers men's basketball team represented St. Francis College during the 1990–91 NCAA Division I men's basketball season. The team was coached by Rich Zvosec, who was in his third year at the helm of the St. Francis Terriers. The Terrier's home games were played at the  Generoso Pope Athletic Complex. The team has been a member of the Northeast Conference since 1981.

The Terriers finished their season at 15–14 overall and 8–8 in conference play. At the end of the regular season Rich Zvosec was named NEC Coach of the Year and Ron Arnold was named NEC Newcomer of the Year.

Over 29 games, Lester James made 149 field-goals on 215 field-goal attempts, producing a 69.3 field-goal percentage that is 16th all-time in NCAA history.

Roster

Schedule and results

|-
!colspan=12 style="background:#0038A8; border: 2px solid #CE1126;;color:#FFFFFF;"| Regular season
  

  
 

  

   

  

|-
!colspan=12 style="background:#0038A8; border: 2px solid #CE1126;;color:#FFFFFF;"| 1991 NEC tournament

 
|-

Awards

Ron Arnold

 Northeast Conference Newcomer of the Year

Second Team All-Conference pick

References

St. Francis Brooklyn Terriers men's basketball seasons
St. Francis
St. Francis Brooklyn Terriers men's basketball
St. Francis Brooklyn Terriers men's basketball